The ENAC Foundation (French: Fondation de l'École nationale de l'aviation civile) was founded in 2012. The goal of the Foundation, as was put forward by École nationale de l'aviation civile, is to promote scientific and public interest activities in aviation, aerospace and aeronautics.

Goals
Subject covers include international development, research, financial aids and innovation.

History
In 2009, the school and its alumni association organized the first edition of the aeronautical book fair. In December 2010, ENAC became one of the ICAO's aviation security training centres.

After the creation of the Foundation in 2012, the first scholarships have been given in 2014, in order to promote international mobility. In 2015, the first research chair in UAV is built, in partnership with Ineo, Cofely and Sagem.

The foundation is supported by GIFAS since 2017.

See also
 Science and technology in France
 Grandes écoles

References

External links
 Official website

Scientific organizations based in France
Foundations based in France
École nationale de l'aviation civile